Klim is a surname. Notable people with this surname include:

 Józef Piotr Klim (born 1960), Polish politician
 Lesley Klim, (born 1995), Namibian international rugby union player 
 Michael Klim (born 1977), Polish-Australian swimmer
 Romuald Klim (1933–2011), Soviet hammer thrower

Fictional characters
 Niels Klim, the protagonist of the 18th century fantasy novel Niels Klim's Underground Travels